George Mountain (4 July 1874 – 10 July 1936) was an English professional footballer who played as a full-back.

References

1874 births
1936 deaths
Footballers from Grimsby
English footballers
Association football fullbacks
Grimsby White Star F.C. players
Waltham Hornets F.C. players
Grimsby Town F.C. players
Grimsby All Saints F.C. players
Leicester City F.C. players
Grimsby Rangers F.C. players
English Football League players